Punganur is a Municipality city in Chittoor district of the Indian state of Andhra Pradesh. It is the headquarters of Punganur Mandel of Palamaner Revenue Division.

The Punganur cow, a distinct breed, is named after the town of its origin. White and light grey in colour with a broad forehead and short horns, its average height is 70–90 cm and its weight is 115–200 kg. The cow has an average milk yield of 3 to 5 litres per day (with a fat content of 8%, whereas the normal milk has a fat content of 3.5%). Its daily feed intake of 5 kg. It is highly drought resistant, and able to survive exclusively on dry fodder. It is now on the verge of extinction. 

Sri Someswara Temple (situated within the precincts of the Zamindar Palace, once the centre of the Punganur Estate), also called Kukkudechuram or Kukkutasuram, is one of the Thevara Vaipputh Thalangal of the Shaivite holy places mentioned in his literature by Tamil Nayanar Appar, the saint-poet of the 7th century A.D. Together with Sambandhar and Sundara, Appar is one of the three most prominent of the 63 Nayanars. This temple was constructed by the Cholas.

Another notable temple is the Pundeswara Temple in Mugavadi near Punganur.

*See Wikipedia references on :

1.Danachinamani, a Royal Lady, Attimabbe was born in Punganur 

2. Famous Kannada Poet Ponna was born in Punganur.

3.Punganur Estate

Geography 
It has an average elevation of 764 meters (2509 feet).

Demographics 
 India census, Punganur had a population of 54,746. Males constitute 49% of the population and females 51%. Punganur has an average literacy rate of 69%, higher than the national average of 59.5%: male literacy is 71%, and female literacy is 56%. In Punganur, 12% of the population is under 6 years of age.

Governance 

Punganur Assembly constituency is a constituency of Andhra Pradesh Legislative Assembly, India. It is one of 14 constituencies and the largest constituency in Chittoor district. Punganur panchayat was upgraded to 3rd Grade Municipality on 19 January 1985.

Movie theatres 
 Balaji Theatre
 Msr Movie Land
 Sri Venkateswara Mahal( Temporarily Closed)
 Taj Mahal Theatre
 Gokul Theatre(Temporarily Closed)

Transport 
After completion of this railway line Punganur will get railway station at Kudavuru. Punganur APS RTC Depot is the biggest bus depot in the entire state in terms of area and garage. There are two bus terminals in Punganur. State-owned APSRTC buses run to different parts of the district, state and interstate – Bangalore, Kolar (KA), and Chennai (TN).

One National Highway (NH42) and one Major State Highway pass through Punganur.

NH 42 - Uravakonda to Krishnagiri,
SH 65 - Punganur to Rompicharla.

Education 
The primary and secondary school education is delivered by government, aided and private schools, under the School Education Department of the state. The languages of instruction followed by different schools are Telugu, Urdu, Hindi and English.

References 

Towns in Chittoor district
Mandal headquarters in Chittoor district